The 1981-82 Turkish First Football League season saw 17 teams in competition. Beşiktaş J.K. won the championship.

League table

Results

References

Turkey - List of final tables (RSSSF)

Süper Lig seasons
1981–82 in Turkish football
Turkey